Gu Yanwu (July 15, 1613 – February 15, 1682), also known as Gu Tinglin, was a Chinese philologist, geographer, and famous scholar-official in Qing dynasty. He spent his youth during the Manchu conquest of China in anti-Manchu activities after the Ming dynasty had been overthrown. He never served the Qing dynasty. Instead, he traveled throughout the country and devoted himself to studies.

Biography

Gu, a native of Jiangsu, was born as Gu Jiang. Gu began his schooling at the age of 14. In the spring of 1645, Gu was recommended to be the position of Bingbu Siwu in the royal court at Nanjing. There he proposed many ideas. Unsatisfied with the royal court's organization, Gu resigned and returned to his hometown. In 1655, local officials laid charges against him and threw him into prison. He was released from prison with the help of a friend.

Inspired by Chen Di, who had demonstrated that the Old Chinese has its own phonological system, Gu divided the words of Old Chinese into 10 rhyme groups, the first one to do so. His positivist approach to a variety of disciplines, and his criticism of Neo-Confucianism had a huge influence on later scholars. His works include Yinxue Wushu, Ri Zhi Lu and Zhao Yu Zhi.

Along with Wang Fuzhi and Huang Zongxi, Gu was named as one of the most outstanding Confucian scholars of the late Ming and early Qing Dynasty.

In 1682, while returning from a friend's home to Huaying, Gu fell from horseback and died the next day.

Aphorism
"Everybody is responsible for the fate of the world"

Alternatively, The rise and fall of the nation concerns everyone; or Everyone bears responsibility for the prosperity of society.

Legacy
Gu is commemorated by Tinglin Park and the Gu Yanwu Museum in Tinglin Park of Kunshan. In 2005, the Central Propaganda Department of China named the Gu Yanwu Museum located at Gu's former residence in Qiandeng town as a "national patriotism education base".

Former residence of Gu Yanwu
The former residence of Gu Yanwu is located in Qiandeng town of Kunshan, a Ming dynasty complex with main hall, living quarter, a study
and a garden. Gu Yanwu's grave is located in a quiet corner of the garden.

See also

 History of Chinese archaeology

References

Further reading

External links

 
 

1613 births
1682 deaths
17th-century geographers
Chinese geographers
Linguists from China
Chinese Confucianists
Ming dynasty philosophers
Ming dynasty scholars
Philosophers from Jiangsu
Qing dynasty philosophers
17th-century Chinese philosophers
Scientists from Suzhou
Writers from Suzhou
Qing dynasty writers
People from Kunshan